Wrights Lake is in the Sierra Nevada mountain range, west of Lake Tahoe on the western border of the Desolation Wilderness. It can be reached via Wrights Road off U.S. Route 50 and the Ice House Road. It provides hiking access to the western portions of the Desolation Wilderness via the Twin Lakes trailhead. Wrights Road is not plowed and is inaccessible during the winter.

References

See also
List of lakes in California

Lakes of the Sierra Nevada (United States)
Lakes of El Dorado County, California
Eldorado National Forest
Lakes of California
Lakes of Northern California